Gołkówko  is a village in the administrative district of Gmina Bartniczka, within Brodnica County, Kuyavian-Pomeranian Voivodeship, in north-central Poland.

From 1975 – 1998 it belonged to the administrative area of Toruń Voivodeship.

The first known mention of Gołkówko is from 1293, when it was then a property of the bishops of Płock.

References

Villages in Brodnica County